José Maria Botelho de Vasconcelos is an Angolan politician. He is the Minister of Petroleum.

Career
Vasconcelos was Minister of Petroleum from 1999 to 2002. In the latter year he was replaced as Minister of Petroleum by Desiderio Costa and was instead appointed as Minister of Energy and Water.

Following the September 2008 parliamentary election, Vasconcelos was again appointed as Minister of Petroleum on 1 October 2008. He was designated as President of the OPEC for 2009.

References

Year of birth missing (living people)
Living people
Petroleum ministers of Angola
Energy and water ministers of Angola
People named in the Panama Papers